Linda Johanna Wilhelmina van Impelen (born 8 August 1985) is a Dutch paralympic alpine skier. She represents the Netherlands in various alpine disciplines. She won a silver medal at the 2018 Winter Paralympics.

Life 
Linda was injured in 2009 in a car accident.

References

External links 
 
 Linda van Impelen at PyeongChang2018.com

1985 births
Living people
Alpine skiers at the 2018 Winter Paralympics
Paralympic alpine skiers of the Netherlands
Paralympic silver medalists for the Netherlands
Medalists at the 2018 Winter Paralympics
Sportspeople from Helmond
Paralympic medalists in alpine skiing
21st-century Dutch women